Paul Robinett, known by his screen name Renetto, is an American vlogger and entrepreneur.  Robinett's videos have attracted over 56 million views, and his YouTube channel has over 38,100 subscribers. His channel has been viewed over 31.2 million times.

YouTube
Robinett began posting videos on YouTube in mid-2006.  Initially, he posted videos as the character "renetto", "a squeaky-voiced, intellectually challenged reviewer of others' YouTube videos."   Robinett released a video called "Diet Coke+Mentos=Human experiment: EXTREME GRAPHIC CONTENT" posted in August 2006, in which he placed a large quantity of Mentos in his mouth and drank Diet Coke at the same time, and implied that he suffered serious injury as a result.  The video received over one million views within 24 hours of being released.  In late 2006 he was ranked on YouTube's "most subscribed"(9th All Time) list.   Robinett was nominated for the first YouTube Video Awards.  He is also an official partner in YouTube's revenue sharing program. Robinett is based in Canal Winchester, Ohio, where he owned and ran a candle shop and sold hand-signed, hand-poured candles.  In September 2007 he announced his move and challenged YouTubers to find him, and ended up in Ahwatukee, Phoenix, Arizona.  He later returned to Ohio but now resides in Florida.

See also
List of YouTube celebrities

References

External links
Official website

Living people
American YouTubers
Place of birth missing (living people)
Year of birth missing (living people)
People from Canal Winchester, Ohio